Galium microphyllum (bracted bedstraw) is a species of plant in the family Rubiaceae. It is widespread across much of Mexico, and found also in Guatemala, Arizona, New Mexico and western Texas.

References

External links
Photo of herbarium specimen at Missouri Botanical Garden, type of Galium microphyllum
Gardening Europe

microphyllum
Flora of Mexico
Flora of Guatemala
Flora of Arizona
Flora of New Mexico
Flora of Texas
Plants described in 1852